This is a list of converts to Hinduism from Christianity.

List

See also
List of converts to Christianity from Hinduism
 Indian-origin religions

References

Hinduism from Christianity
Lists of Hindus
Hinduism-related lists